The 2021–22 season was the 103rd season in the existence of Angers SCO and the club's seventh consecutive season in the top flight of French football. In addition to the domestic league, Angers also participated in this season's edition of the Coupe de France.

Angers were allowed to stay in the top flight after their appeal against relegation to Ligue 2 along with Bordeaux was accepted.

Players

First-team squad

Out on loan

Transfers

In

Out

Pre-season and friendlies

Competitions

Overall record

Ligue 1

League table

Results summary

Results by round

Matches
The league fixtures were announced on 25 June 2021.

Coupe de France

Statistics

Goalscorers

References

Angers SCO seasons
Angers